Krusatodon is a genus of extinct docodont mammaliaform from the Middle Jurassic of the United Kingdom. It is known from the Forest Marble Formation, Kirtlington, in England, and also from a single molar tooth in the Kilmaluag Formation on the Isle of Skye, Scotland.

Krusatodon is only known from a handful of individual molar teeth, but like all docodontans, these teeth have more complex cusps than other groups of early mammaliaformes. The name Krusatodon honours the palaeontologist Dr. Georg Krusat, who carried out important research on docodonts.

References

Docodonts
Jurassic synapsids of Europe
Fossil taxa described in 2003
Taxa named by Denise Sigogneau‐Russell
Prehistoric cynodont genera